The radial fossa is a slight depression found on the humerus above the front part of the capitulum. It receives the anterior border of the head of the radius when the forearm is flexed.

Structure 
The joint capsule of the elbow attaches to the humerus just proximal to the radial fossa.

Additional images

References

External links
 

Humerus